is a district located in Ōita Prefecture, Japan.

As of 2003, the district has an estimated population of 29,807 and the density of 53.43 persons per km2. The total area is 557.85 km2.

Towns and villages
Kokonoe
Kusu

Districts in Ōita Prefecture